Salicornia virginica (American glasswort, pickleweed) is a halophytic perennial dicot which  grows in various zones of intertidal salt marshes and can be found in alkaline flats. It is native to various regions of the Northern Hemisphere including both coasts of North America from Canada to Mexico.

The plant is one of the Salicornia species being tested as biofuel crop as its seeds are composed of 32% oil, and being a halophyte, it can be irrigated with salt water.

Saliconia virginica is classified as a obligate wetland (OBL) species which means it "occurs almost always (estimated probability 99%) under natural conditions in wetlands".

References

virginica
Salt marsh plants
Flora of North America
Flora of Asia
Energy crops
Flora of Europe
Plants described in 1753
Taxa named by Carl Linnaeus